Nesselbach may refer to:
 Nesselbach (Bühler), a river of Baden-Württemberg, Germany, right tributary of the Bühler
 Nesselbach (Rombach), a river of Baden-Württemberg, Germany, upper part of the Rombach (tributary of the Aal)
 Nesselbach (Lenne), a river of North Rhine-Westphalia, Germany, right tributary of the Lenne
 a village in the district of Schwäbisch Hall, in Baden-Württemberg, Germany, today part of Langenburg
 a river in Döbling, district of Vienna, Austria